Goodall House may refer to:

Goodall House (Macon, Georgia), listed on the NRHP in Georgia
Seaborn Goodall House, Sylvania, Georgia, listed on the NRHP in Screven County, Georgia
Thomas Goodall House, Sanford, Maine, listed on the NRHP in York County, Maine

See also
Goodall-Woods Law Office, Bath, New Hampshire, listed on the NRHP in Grafton County, New Hampshire
Goodall Building, Cincinnati, Ohio, NRHP-listed